Travelcade was an Australian travel documentary series produced in Townsville, North Queensland. It debuted on 21 July 1990 and ran regularly through the 1990s, on Australian television. It was one of the first Australian travel shows produced and became a multi-award-winning program and was a major breakthrough for local production at a time when regional and Australian television series were at a minimum.

Travelcade was unique at the time in that it was a sort of pictorial current affairs program – as opposed to a straight documentary – that had a news angle, featuring the cultural, historical, environmental and social impacts in addition to the in-depth interviews with the locals and characters of the destination.

History 
Travelcade was the first Australian weekly holiday and travel show to go to air in Queensland and was produced and directed by award-winning journalist and producer Rick Anderton for Anderton Enterprises and N.Q Media Services. Travelcade was produced and conceived by Anderton with the focus on tourism and its future – focusing on developments and initiatives that would have a major bearing on the tourism industry's future in the 1990s. It was a half-hour weekly television program that featured resorts, holidays destinations, events and attractions involved in tourism and travel throughout Australia and the Asia Pacific region.

The program first aired in 1990 as a trial called Travelcade '90 and later changed its name to Travelcade. The program initially started out featuring different travel highlights around Queensland and then extended right across Australia and to the Asia Pacific region, focussing on the outback and more isolated locations that were more difficult to access but ideal for family holidays.

The first show broadcast in 1990 reported on what people in Far North Queensland were doing to cope in the wake of the 1989 pilots’ dispute.  It took a look at how Queensland promoted itself internationally and overseas and how Australia was seen as a tourist destination by TV viewers.

Achievements 

Travelcade soon became a multi-award-winning program, running for 6 years, and became one of the longest running travel documentaries in Australia at its time.  It was relayed to an estimated 6.8 million viewers throughout Australia and Oceania.  Broadcast areas included Queensland, New South Wales, Victoria, Central Australia and Papua New Guinea on the TEN Queensland, Prime and the QSTV Satellite Networks.

Within a year of going to air, it won its first award and was praised by tourism bodies for its coverage and authenticity. In 1991 it won the Queensland Tourist and Travel Award for Electronic Media. It won the 4MK/Whitsunday Tourism Award in 1994, and was twice a finalist in the Australian Tourism Awards.

Historical significance 
 
Travelcade reflects the regional production standards of its time in Australian film and television, and also preserves historical snapshots of different locations and their cultures in the 1990s. 
 
Travelcade was one of Australia’s first and longest running multi-award-winning Travel documentary programs of its time that was produced in a regional location, Townsville. The program ran on prime-time television for 6 years reflecting Australian viewers’ interest in the travel documentary genre, and Travelcade in specific, during that period.

The programs followed current issues of the time including in-depth interviews with key figures and tourists of different destinations.  It featured professional cinematography to highlight the natural wildlife, scenery, and different cultural events, issues and attractions of varying locations. This video evidence provides information and footage for an accurate reflection of how things were at the time. Many episodes highlighted the historical, environmental and cultural significance of the location.

Many of the destinations selected featured remote locations and involved all forms of travel, as such Travelcade was one of the first television crews to film and produce documentaries in some areas.   Feature stories were produced on Rotorua and Queenstown in New Zealand,  the Pilbara region in Western Australia and many remote villages and places in Papua New Guinea such as the Kokoda Trail, Sepik River, Mudmen of Asaro, Huli Wigmen of Tari Basin, Bilolo Highlands, the Manus Island and Rabaul (before and after the volcanic eruptions of 1994).

Important Episodes – Locations and Stories 

Travel Cruises and Adventure Stories

Savannaland Train Ride – Pure Pleasure Diving Cruise – Royland Whitsunday Island Cruise – Coral Princess Reef and Island Cruise – Lexus Marlin Deep Sea Fishing Classic -  Atlantic Clipper Ocean Spirit Cruises – Captain Cook Island Cruises – P&O South Pacific Cruise – Indian Pacific Sydney to Perth – Kangaroo Explorer Cruise – Advanced Driving – Hinchinbrook Kayaking and Yachting – Tiger Moth Scenic Flights – Top End 4 Wheel Drive Safari – Raging Thunder Rafting – Down to the Lower Sepik River – Hinchinbrook Rent-a-yacht

Australian Islands

Fraser Island – Green Island – Long Island – South Molle – Dunk Island – Bedarra Island – Kepple Island – Magnetic Island – Orpheus Island – Double Island – Lizard Island – Hamilton Island – Hayman Island – Fitzroy Island – Heron Island – Brampton Island – Daydream Island – Lady Elliot Island – Hinchinbrook Island – Fantasia Island

Wet Tropics Locations

Wallaman Falls – Lake Eachum – Barron Gorge – Kuranda – Mount Spec Ranges – Jourama Falls – Mungalli Falls – Tully Gorge  – Lake Placid – Murray Falls – Daintree National Park

Queensland

Town of 1770 – O’reilleys Resort – Cherrabah Homestead – Bunya Park – Ginger Factory – Billabong Sanctuary – Coolangatta – Silky Oaks – Daintree Lodge – Mission Beach – Airlie Beach – Noosa – Malaney – Montville  Sunshine Coast – Binna Burra – Laguna Quays – Greenvale Outback Resort – Kroombit Homestead Holiday Farm – Cairns Colonial Club – Kohuna Hervey Bay – Gympy – Roma – Ranvenshoe – Reef Wonderland Townsville – Reef Casino Cairns – Hall of Fame Longreach – Undara Lava Tubes – Coconut Beach – Butterfly Farm Kuranda – Port Douglas – Finch Hatton Gorge – Canarvon Gorge – Gunpowder Station Lawn Hill – Lake Tinaroo – Paradise Palms – Capricorn International Resort – Olsens Cave – Cooktown – Palm Cove – Wetherby Station – Santan Port Douglas – Cassowary Licuala Trail – Maryborough – Chilligoe Caves – Hervey Bay

New South Wales

Sydney – Hunter Valley – Vineyards – Balloon Riding – Eagle Reach

Gold Coast

Seaworld – Warner Bros Movie World – Dreamworld – Wet and Wild – Sanctuary Cove – Jupiters Casino – Coolangatta Twin Cities – Royal Pines Resort – Sheraton Mirage Resort

Western Australia

Wave Rock – Albany – Monkey Mia – Broome – Cable Beach – Pilbara – Hammersly Gorges – Joondalup – Margaret River Vineyards – Whale World Albany – Vines Resort – Karri Giants of Pemberton – Merribrook – Freemantle – Observation City – Pearl Farming off the North Coast

Tasmania

Hobart – Port Arthur – Cradle Mountain – Strahan – Freycinet – West Coast

New Zealand

Roturua – Queenstown – Milford Sound – Auckland – Hotel De Vin – Taraware Volcano – Contiki Backpacker Tour – Black Water Rafting – North Island Rainforest – Watamo Caves

Philippines Locations

Manila – Boracay Island – Cebu Beach – Devao – Eagle Sanctuary – Mindanao – Evergreen Gold Resort – Samal Island Resort – Puerto Princesca Island

Papua New Guinea

Port Moresby Hiri Moala Festival – Lae – Rabaul (before and after volcanic eruptions) – Kavieng – Manus Island – Walindi Hot Springs – Trobriand Islands – Amphlett Islands – Mount Hagen – Smoken Bodies of Aseki – Goroka – Sepik River – Mudmen of Asaro – Kokoda Trail – New Ireland – Huli Wigmen of Tari Basin – Bilolo Highlands

If you interested in any Travelcade programs, segments or footage please contact Sarah or Richard.

Notable people 
Rick Anderton – Executive Producer and Director of Travelcade
 Producer and Director of Newsweek
 Australian National Thorn Awards for Journalism – 1981, 1983 and 1986
 Queensland Tourism Awards for Media Production – 1992 and 1994
 Twice Finalist in Australian Tourism Awards for Media Production
 Gavin Alder – Journalist (Australian National Awards for Journalism)
Christina Amies – Presenter

Joanne Desmond – Presenter

Larry Schmidt – Cameraman

Wade Sinclair – Cameraman

Notable Interviews

Paul Terry – Actor "Anzacs"

Colleen McCollough – Australian Author

Decline of regional television and aggregation 

Due to a number of changes effecting the regional television industry in Australia including “aggregation” and media-ownership laws, technology, and increasing costs in production and equipment, combined with a low economy, and growing competition from larger networks with more financial support, it was very difficult for local television productions to survive, especially independent productions that relied upon independent sponsorship.

References 

Australian television series